Mentuhui is a Christian movement in China. It possibly has more than half a million members. It was founded in Shaanxi in 1989 by Ji Sanbao, born 1937, who claims to be Jesus. He has been influenced by Jesus Family. He claims to have 12 disciples. It has about 100,000 members in Guizhou. It is at least present in Shaanxi, Gansu, Hebei, Qinghai, Hunan, Jiangsu, Yunnan, Shandong, Sichuan, Xinjiang, too. There have been numerous arrests, including Ji Sanbao. In Tonggu County in Jiangsu, at least 51 members of the movement were detained in 1999.
Mentuhui predicted the end of the world for 2000.

See also 
Beili Wang

Notes 

1989 establishments in China
Christian denominations in China
Christian organizations established in 1989

Chinese cults